Karanpur (Assembly constituency) is one of constituencies of Rajasthan Legislative Assembly in the Ganganagar (Lok Sabha constituency).

Karanpur Constituency covers all voters from Karanpur tehsil and Padampur tehsil.

Election Results

2018

See also 
 Member of the Legislative Assembly (India)

References

Sri Ganganagar district
Assembly constituencies of Rajasthan